Dale Gordon Hoganson (born July 8, 1949) is a Canadian former professional ice hockey player who played 344 games in the National Hockey League and 378 games in the World Hockey Association between 1969 and 1982. He played for the Los Angeles Kings, Montreal Canadiens, Quebec Nordiques, and Birmingham Bulls. In 1973 Dale was included with Montreal Canadiens official Stanley Cup winning picture, and was awarded a Stanley Cup ring. His name was left off the Stanley Cup, because did not officially qualify. He is cousin with Paul Hoganson.

Career statistics

Regular season and playoffs

Awards
 WCJHL First All-Star Team – 1968
 WCHL All-Star Team – 1969

External links 
 

1949 births
Living people
Birmingham Bulls players
Canadian ice hockey defencemen
Canadian people of Norwegian descent
Estevan Bruins players
Fredericton Express players
Ice hockey people from Saskatchewan
Los Angeles Kings draft picks
Los Angeles Kings players
Montreal Canadiens players
Nova Scotia Voyageurs players
Quebec Nordiques (WHA) players
Quebec Nordiques players
Sportspeople from North Battleford
Springfield Kings players
Stanley Cup champions